Aladinpur  is a village in Jalandhar - I in Jalandhar district of Punjab State, India. The village is administrated by Sarpanch an elected representative of the village.

Demography 

As of the 2011 Census of India, the village has a total number of 158 houses and the population of 734 of which 374 are males while 360 are females.  According to the report published by Census India in 2011, out of the total population of the village 570 people are from Schedule Caste and the village does not have any Schedule Tribe population so far.

See also
List of villages in India

References

External links 
 Tourism of Punjab 
 Census of Punjab

Villages in Jalandhar district